Ludmila Lubomirova "Lucy" Diakovska (born 2 April 1976) is a Bulgarian and German singer and television personality. She rose to prominence as one of the founding members of the all-female pop band No Angels, the "biggest-selling German girlband to date", according to the German media.

After a series of commercially successful releases with the group, Diakovska released two singles and her solo album Lucylicious under her same-titled stage name in 2005. In 2008, she became part of the jury on reality shows Music Idol and Starmania, the Bulgarian and Austrian version of the Idol series respectively, and later joined the jury the German version of Popstars in 2012.

Early life 
Diakovska is the oldest child of Lubomir Diakovski, an opera singer, and Rositza Diakovska, a pianist. Her younger brother named Alexander (b. 1982) is a professional basketball player. Her grandfather is a famous Bulgarian folk composer. Her family moved to Germany.

At the age of six she got her first stage performance at a local opera house and in the following years she trained herself in singing and dancing. After her high school graduation in 1994 Diakovska decided to move to Germany to get trained at the Stage School of Music, Dance and Drama in Hamburg. At the same time she worked as a dancer for the musical Buddy, where she even got hold of a recurring role a little later.

Career

No Angels

Encouraged to chance her luck in the professional music business, Diakovska decided to audition for the 2000 debut of the German reality television program Popstars. She entered the competition with thousands of other women, and the judges, Simone Angel, Rainer Moslener and Mario M. Mendryzcki, were impressed with her performance in Hamburg. She earned a position in the top thirty finalists and immediately travelled to Majorca, Spain to join her competitors for a workshop there. In the end Diakovska made it to the final ten on the show, and during a special episode in November 2000, jury member Moslener disclosed that she was chosen to become part of the final girl group No Angels.

With the final five members of the band in place, Popstars continued tracking the development and struggles of the group who left homes to move into a shared flat near Munich. However, it took another four months until the band released their debut single "Daylight in Your Eyes", which would subsequently appear on the band's debut album Elle'ments (2001). Both the single and the album became an unexpected but record-breaking success, when both instantly entered the top position on the Austrian, German and Swiss Media Control singles, albums and airplay charts, making No Angels one of the most successful debuts in years.
 
In the following years No Angels released another two number-one studio albums, Now ... Us! and Pure, a live album and a successful swing album branded When the Angels Swing, totalling twelve singles altogether – including four-number one singles. Eventually selling more than five million singles and albums worldwide, No Angels became the best-selling German girl band to date and the most successful girl group of continental Europe between the years of 2001 and 2003. On 5 September 2003, the four remaining members of the band (Jessica Wahls had left the band following the birth of her first child in February 2003) announced that they would no longer be performing together after three years of continual touring and increasing cases of illness. The release of The Best of No Angels in November of the same year marked the end of the band, with each member going their separate ways in early 2004.

Lucy re-joined No Angels who made a powerful revival. In March 2008 they were selected to represent Germany at the Eurovision Song Contest 2008 finals in Belgrade in May. This is an honour for Lucy. She, however, was not the first Bulgarian to represent Germany in the Eurovision finals. In 1964 this was done by Nora Nova.

Personal life

Diakovska publicly came out as lesbian during the fourth season of the Bulgarian reality show VIP Brother.

Filmography

Discography

Albums

Singles

Album appearances
 2004: "The Wish"
 2005: "Chiquitita"
 2009: "Ich wart' auf dich, mein Prinz" 
 2010: "High on Life"

References

External links 
Official website (archived)

1976 births
Living people
Lesbian singers
Lesbian songwriters
English-language singers from Bulgaria
English-language singers from Germany
German musical theatre actresses
Bulgarian stage actresses
Big Brother (Bulgarian TV series) contestants
Bulgarian LGBT musicians
German lesbian musicians
German LGBT singers
German LGBT songwriters
Musicians from Pleven
Bulgarian emigrants to Germany
Naturalized citizens of Germany
Popstars winners
No Angels members
X Factor (Bulgarian TV series)
German women pop singers
Bulgarian pop singers
Eurovision Song Contest entrants of 2008
Eurovision Song Contest entrants for Germany
20th-century Bulgarian women singers
20th-century German women singers
21st-century Bulgarian women singers
21st-century German women singers
20th-century LGBT people
21st-century LGBT people